Agnė Čepelytė (born 1 December 1995) is a Lithuanian former tennis player.

In her career, she won one doubles title on the ITF Women's Circuit. On 25 May 2015, she reached her best singles ranking of world No. 1089 and peaked at No. 748 in the doubles rankings.

Playing for Lithuania at the Fed Cup, Čepelytė has a win–loss record of 2–2.

ITF finals

Doubles (1–1)

References

External links
 
 
 

1995 births
Living people
Sportspeople from Panevėžys
Lithuanian female tennis players